WWFW (103.9 FM) is an adult hits radio station located in Fort Wayne, Indiana.

In March 2014, Adams Radio Group entered an agreement to purchase Summit City's cluster (which includes WXKE). Days later, Adams announced they would purchase Oasis Radio Group's stations. To meet ownership limits, Adams would retain WNHT, WGL and the then-WXKE, as well as acquiring Oasis Radio Group's WJFX and WBTU, while selling off WHPP to Fort Wayne Catholic Radio, and selling WGL-FM to Calvary Radio Network. WLYV and two translators (on 96.9 FM and 103.3 FM) would also be acquired by Adams. The transaction, at a price of $6.4 million, was consummated on June 2, 2014. As a result, Adams planned on massive format restructuring. On June 2, Adams announced that WXKE would move to the stronger 96.3 signal, displacing WNHT's Rhythmic Contemporary format. The two stations would simulcast for ten days.

The station changed to the current WWFW call sign on June 2, 2014.

On June 20, 2014, at 10:39 pm, after stunting for an hour and a half with music similar to that of call holding or elevator music, WWFW launched an Adult Contemporary format, branded as "The New Soft Rock 103-9". The first song on "Soft Rock" was "Celebration" by Kool and the Gang.

Starting in the fall of 2014, WWFW has annually made a seasonal format change to 24/7 Christmas music in November and December.

The station initially featured a Soft AC lean, but gradually evolved to Mainstream AC during their first year on the air.

During their Christmas music stint in November 2016, WWFW dropped the "Soft Rock" branding in favor of "Christmas 103.9". On December 7, the station announced through their Facebook page that they would rebrand as "103.9 Sunny FM" on the 26th. The change took place at midnight on that date; the first song on Sunny FM was "Faith" by George Michael (serving as a tribute to Michael, as he had died on Christmas Day). The format would shift back to soft adult contemporary by 2018.

On December 18, 2019, WWFW announced that they would flip to Variety Hits as "103.9 Wayne FM" on Christmas night at 6pm. At that time, after playing "Merry Christmas Darling" by The Carpenters (bookending the format, in a sense, as it was the last Christmas song played before the launch of Sunny FM in 2016), the changeover took place. The station for 10 seconds then stunted with a 10-second electronic voice counting down from 10 to 1. This was followed by dead silence. A disk jockey then recommends about the new switch including examples such as 2 second clips of 24 different adult hit examples for less than a minute. The first song on "Wayne FM" was "Mary Jane's Last Dance" by Tom Petty and the Heartbreakers.

Former logos

References

External links
103.9 Wayne FM's website
The Patriot 103.3 Facebook
Adams Radio Ft. Wayne

WFW
Adult hits radio stations in the United States